"Ferry Cross the Mersey" is a song written by Gerry Marsden. It was first recorded by his band Gerry and the Pacemakers and released in late 1964 in the UK and in 1965 in the United States. It was a hit on both sides of the Atlantic, reaching number six in the United States and number eight in the UK. The song is from the film of the same name and was released on its soundtrack album. In the mid-1990s, a musical theatre production, also titled Ferry Cross the Mersey, related Gerry Marsden's Merseybeat days; it premiered in Liverpool and played in the UK, Australia, and Canada.

Song title and lyrics

"Mersey" refers to the River Mersey in northwest England, which flows into the Irish Sea at Liverpool. The Mersey Ferry runs between Liverpool and Birkenhead and Seacombe on the Wirral Peninsula.

Cash Box described the song as "a touching, soft cha cha best sentimental opus that Gerry vocals with much sincerity."

Chart performance
"Ferry Cross the Mersey" became a Top 10 hit in the UK and also in the U.S., where it was a bigger hit. It did best in Chicago, where it reached #1 on WLS-AM.

Weekly charts

Year-end charts

Charity record for The Hillsborough Disaster Fund 

In May 1989, a charity version of "Ferry Cross the Mersey" was released in aid of those affected by the Hillsborough disaster, which had claimed the lives of 95 Liverpool fans the previous month (a 96th, Tony Bland, died in 1993 as a consequence of that disaster and a 97th, Andrew Devine, in 2021). The song was recorded by Liverpool artists The Christians, Holly Johnson, Paul McCartney, Gerry Marsden and Stock Aitken Waterman. The single held the #1 spot in the UK chart for three weeks and the Irish chart for two weeks.

Chart performance

Other cover versions 
 Frankie Goes to Hollywood recorded a cover of "Ferry Cross the Mersey" for the B-side of the 12-inch single  "Relax", released in October 1983. It was subsequently included on their later compilations Bang!... The Greatest Hits of Frankie Goes to Hollywood (1993) and Maximum Joy (2000).
 Canadian popular musician Burton Cummings (of The Guess Who) recorded a solo version on his 1997 live album Up Close and Alone.
 In 2003, Pat Metheny included an instrumental cover of the song on his acoustic album One Quiet Night.
 The German-British punk rock band Die Toten Hosen released a cover version in 2020 on their album "Learning English Lesson 3 - Mersey Beat!". The album peaked at position 2 in the German album chart.

References

1964 singles
1989 singles
Gerry and the Pacemakers songs
Paul McCartney songs
The Christians (band) songs
Holly Johnson songs
Charity singles
All-star recordings
Song recordings produced by George Martin
Song recordings produced by Stock Aitken Waterman
UK Singles Chart number-one singles
UK Independent Singles Chart number-one singles
Irish Singles Chart number-one singles
Songs about Liverpool
Songs about rivers
Songs about boats
Capitol Records singles
Laurie Records singles
1964 songs
Songs written by Gerry Marsden
Columbia Graphophone Company singles
Pete Waterman Entertainment singles